Francis Amenu (born ?) is a Ghanaian metallurgical engineer who also trained and ordained as a minister. He served in the Evangelical Presbyterian (E.P.) Church, Ghana. In 1999, he was assigned to serve Ghanaian congregations in London, United Kingdom. There in 2003, before returning to Africa, he founded the E.P. Church, UK.

In 2009 Amenu was elected as the first Moderator of the General Assembly of the Evangelical Presbyterian Church, Ghana, after the gathering was changed from a General Synod. He is addressed as the Right Reverend. He served in that position until 2015. He also served as the Chairman of the Christian Council of Ghana beginning in 2013.

Education
Francis Amenu was born to an educated family in Ghana. After attending local schools, he was educated as a mining engineer at the Kwame Nkrumah University of Science and Technology School of Mines at Tarkwa in the Western Region of Ghana between 1973 and 1976.

He next was called to Christian ministry. He studied at the Trinity Theological Seminary, Legon in Ghana between 1982 and 1990. He later attended the Christian Theological Seminary, Indianapolis, Indiana, in the United States, between 1995 and 1997.

Christian ministry
Amenu served in various capacities in the E.P. Church between 1985 and 1999, including as the head pastor at the Accra New Town branch of the church.

In 1999 he was posted to London in the United Kingdom (UK), where he was the Ghanaian Minister in London and chaplain to the Ghanaian community in the United Reformed Church in the UK between 1999 and 2003. He was instrumental in starting the UK branch of the E.P. Church during his stay there.

Since his return to Ghana in 2003, Amenu served as the District Pastor at Madina. He also served as a lecturer at the Trinity Theological Seminary, and the new Evangelical Presbyterian University College at Ho in Ghana.

In August 2008, Rev. Amenu was elected as the Moderator of the General Synod of the E.P. Church at its 67th synod at Ho. He had unsuccessfully stood for election as the Synod Clerk of the church in 2004.

The churches changed the name of their decision-making body from General Synod to a General Assembly in 2009. That year, Amenu was elected to succeed Livingstone Buama as the first Moderator of the General Assembly of the Evangelical Presbyterian Church, Ghana (E.P. Church). His six-year term ended in 2015. He was succeeded by Seth Agidi.

Francis Amenu became the Chairman of the Christian Council of Ghana in 2013. He was succeeded in April 2014 by Emmanuel Martey, who was also Moderator of the Presbyterian Church of Ghana at the time.

Marriage and family
He is married with four children together.

See also
Evangelical Presbyterian Church, Ghana

References 

Living people
Ghanaian clergy
Ghanaian Presbyterians
Ghanaian theologians
Ghanaian religious leaders
Year of birth missing (living people)
Place of birth missing (living people)
Ghanaian engineers
Kwame Nkrumah University of Science and Technology alumni
Ewe people
Trinity Theological Seminary, Legon alumni